The 2020 East Tennessee State Buccaneers football team represented East Tennessee State University (ETSU) in the 2020–21 NCAA Division I FCS football season and were in the fifth year of their second stint as football members of the Southern Conference (SoCon). They were led by third-year head coach Randy Sanders and played their home games at William B. Greene Jr. Stadium.

Schedule
East Tennessee State had a game against Georgia, which was canceled due to the COVID-19 pandemic.

References

East Tennessee State
East Tennessee State Buccaneers football seasons
East Tennessee State Buccaneers football